Eryngium armatum, known by the common names coastal eryngo and prickly coyote thistle, is a species of flowering plant in the family Apiaceae.

It is endemic to the coastline of northern and central California, where it grows along beaches and coastal bluffs. Many populations are in the San Francisco Bay Area.

Description
Eryngium armatum is a low perennial herb growing patches of thick green to yellow-green leaves, each long and straight, sometimes with serrated or toothed edges.

Atop stout stems are inflorescences of spiky flower heads each nearly a centimeter wide. Each is surrounded by seven or eight long, sharp-pointed bracts about two centimeters long, and sometimes more layers of bractlets on top. The tiny white to purplish flowers are tucked between the layers of bracts.

External links
 Calflora Database: Eryngium armatum (Coastal eryngo,  Coyote thistle, Prickly coyote thistle)
Jepson eFlora (TJM2) treatment of Eryngium armatum
USDA Plants Profile
UC CalPhotos gallery of Eryngium armatum

armatum
Endemic flora of California
Taxa named by John Merle Coulter
Taxa named by Sereno Watson
Flora without expected TNC conservation status